For 1987 in television, see:

1987 in Albanian television
1987 in American television
1987 in Australian television
1987 in Austrian television
1987 in Belgian television
1987 in Brazilian television
1987 in British television
1987 in Canadian television
1987 in Czech television
1987 in Danish television
1987 in Dutch television
1987 in French television
1987 in German television
1987 in Irish television
1987 in Israeli television
1987 in Japanese television
1987 in New Zealand television
1987 in Norwegian television
1987 in Philippine television
1987 in Portuguese television
1987 in Scottish television
1987 in Singapore television
1987 in South African television
1987 in Swedish television